Mugwort (Artemisia vulgaris), or common wormwood, is a medicinal and culinary herb native to Eurasia and northern Africa.

Mugwort may also refer to:

Plants in the genus Artemisia
 Artemisia absinthium, – mugwort, wormwood 
 Artemisia annua – annual mugwort
 Artemisia argyi - Chinese mugwort, used in traditional Chinese medicine
 Artemisia douglasiana – Douglas mugwort, native to western North America
 Artemisia glacialis – alpine mugwort
 Artemisia indica - Japanese mugwort
 Artemisia japonica - Oriental mugwort
 Artemisia ludoviciana - western mugwort, native to North America
 Artemisia norvegica – Norwegian mugwort
 Artemisia princeps – Japanese mugwort ("yomogi"), Korean mugwort ("ssuk"), used as a culinary herb and in traditional Chinese medicine.
 Artemisia stelleriana – hoary mugwort
 Artemisia verlotiorum – Chinese mugwort
 Artemisia vulgaris - L.–mugwort, felonherb, green-ginger, common wormwood

Other plants
 Tanacetum vulgare, also known as common tansy, native to Eurasia